Greystead Bridge is a wooden suspension pedestrian bridge across the River North Tyne at Greystead in Northumberland, England.

History
The bridge, which has one span, was completed in 1862. It is a Grade II listed structure. It was intended to connect communities on the south bank of the river with Thorneyburn railway station on the north side.

References

Bridges in Northumberland
Crossings of the River Tyne
Grade II listed bridges
Grade II listed buildings in Northumberland